A thaumatrope is an optical toy that was popular in the 19th century. A disk with a picture on each side is attached to two pieces of string. When the strings are twirled quickly between the fingers the two pictures appear to blend into one due to the persistence of vision.

Examples of common thaumatrope pictures include a bare tree on one side of the disk, and its leaves on the other, or a bird on one side and a cage on the other. Many classic thaumatropes also included riddles or short poems, with one line on each side.

Thaumatropes can provide an illusion of motion with the two sides of the disc each depicting a different phase of the motion, but no examples are known to have been produced until long after the introduction of the first widespread animation device: the phénakistiscope.

Thaumatropes are often seen as important antecedents of motion pictures and in particular of animation. 

The name translates roughly as "wonder turner", from  "wonder" and τρόπος "turn".

Invention

A 2012 paper argues that a prehistoric bone disk found in the Laugerie-Basse rockshelter is a thaumatrope, designed to be spun using leather thongs threaded through the central perforation.

The invention of the thaumatrope is usually credited to British physician John Ayrton Paris. He described the device in his 1827 educational book for children Philosophy in Sport Made Science in Earnest, with an illustration by George Cruikshank.

British mathematician Charles Babbage recalled in 1864 that the thaumatrope was invented by the geologist William Henry Fitton. Babbage had told Fitton how the astronomer John Herschel had challenged him to show both sides of a shilling at once. Babbage held the coin in front of a mirror, but Herschel showed how both sides were visible when the coin was spun on the table. A few days later Fitton brought Babbage a new illustration of the principle, consisting of a round disc of card suspended between two pieces of sewing silk. This disc had a parrot on one side and a cage at the other side. Babbage and Fitton made several different designs and amused some friends with them for a short while. They forgot about it until some months later they heard about the "wonderful invention of Dr. Paris".

French artist Antoine Claudet stated in 1867 that he had heard that Paris had once been present when Herschel demonstrated his rotating coin trick to his children and subsequently got the idea for the thaumatrope. 

Claudet also noted in 1867 that the thaumatrope could create a three-dimensional illusion. A spinning rectangular thaumatrope with the alternating letters of the name "Victoria" on each side, showed the full word with the letters at two different distances from the observer's eye. If the two strings of the thaumatrope are attached to the same side of the card the thickness of the card accounts for a small difference in the distances when each side is visible.

Commercial production

The first commercial thaumatrope was registered at Stationers' Hall on 2 April 1825 and published by W. Phillips in London as The Thaumatrope; being Rounds of Amusement or How to Please and Surprise By Turns, sold in boxes of 12 or 18 discs. It included a sheet with mottoes or riddles for each disc, often with a political meaning. Paris was widely regarded as the author, but wasn't mentioned on the product or its packaging and he later claimed in a letter to Michael Faraday "I was first induced to publish it, at the earnest desire of my late friend Wm Phillips. (...) I may add that I never put my name to it".

The steep price of a set (seven shilling for 12 discs or half a guinea for 18) was criticized, half a guinea would have been about a week's pay for an average worker. It was also defended: its inventor should be able to earn something from his invention while it was new, before it was widely copied as seen before with the kaleidoscope. 
Paris later claimed he gained £150,- from its sales in the United Kingdom.

As expected, pirate copies soon became common and were much cheaper. For instance the 'Thaumatropical Amusement' was available in boxes of six discs for one shilling.

Although the toy became very popular, original copies are now very rare; only one extant set produced by W. Phillips is currently known (in the Richard Balzer collection) and one single disc is at the Cinématheque Française.

Other early publishers across the continent included Alphonse Giroux & Compagnie in France and Trentsensky in Austria. In 1833 these companies would be the very first publishers of the next big "philosophical toy" craze: the Phénakisticope.

Animation
In the first 1827 edition of "Philosophy in Sport" John Ayrton Paris described a version with a circular frame around the disc through which the strings were threaded. A little tug on the strings would cause a minor change in the axis of rotation and thus a slight shift in the position of the images while revolving. An adapted version of the standard horse and jockey thaumatrope could thus first show the jockey on the horse before being thrown over its head. In a new 1833 edition of the book this example was replaced with a version without a ring but with an elastic string added to change the axis by pulling it. This version showed a drinking man lowering and raising a bottle to and from his mouth, with an illustration of the different sides of the disc and the different states of the resulting image. Several other examples were described in the book. The balls of a juggler could appear as in motion and the two painted balls could be seen as three or four when the axis of rotation was shifted. A tailor in a pulpit next to a pond with a goose fluttering in the water would have the tailor falling into the water and the goose taking his place in the pulpit. No commercially produced versions with these techniques are known. 

On 26 November 1869 the Rev. Richard Pilkington received "Useful Registered Design Number 5074" for his Pedemascope. This was a variation of the thaumatrope. It had a card with pictures "painted in two different positions on both sides". This card was placed in the two-part mahogany holder with a handle and a brass pin that would semi-rotate the card when it was twirled (a bit of iron preventing full rotation). Transparent or cut-out variations were suggested for use with the magic lantern. 

In 1892 mechanical engineer Thomas E. Bickle received British Patent No. 20,281 for a clockwork thaumatrope with "pictures or designs exhibiting some action or motion in two phases, which are thus alternately presented to the eye in rapid succession with small intervals of rest".

Thaumatropes in popular culture
The 1827 book Philosophy in Sport made Science in Earnest, being an attempt to illustrate the first principles of natural philosophy by the aid of popular toys and sports featured the thaumatrope and warned against inferior copies. The chapter head was illustrated with a drawing by George Cruikshank, depicting a man demonstrating the thaumatrope to a girl and a boy. It was first published anonymously, but posthumous editions were credited to John Ayrton Paris.

In the 1999 Tim Burton film Sleepy Hollow, a bird and cage thaumatrope is demonstrated by Johnny Depp's character.

In the 2006 Christopher Nolan film The Prestige, Michael Caine's character repeatedly uses a thaumatrope as a way of explaining persistence of vision.

In the 2011 Martin Scorsese film Hugo, the final scene begins in the middle of a conversation about cinema precursors, including the thaumatrope.

In the 2013 video game BioShock Infinite the bird and the cage thaumatrope is used several times.

In the 2022 film The Wonder, a thaumatrope is featured frequently throughout the film.

See also
Strobe light

References

External links
A collection of animated thaumatropes – The Richard Balzer Collection
Demonstration
BBC Film Network – The Persistent Resistance of Vision – short film parodying the thaumatrope
demonstration of an antique/early thaumatrope

Audiovisual introductions in 1824
Animation techniques
History of animation
Optical illusions
Novelty items
Optical toys